Ulf Sandegren (born 21 February 1964) is a Swedish fencer. He competed in the épée events at the 1988 and 1992 Summer Olympics.

References

External links
 

1964 births
Living people
Swedish male épée fencers
Olympic fencers of Sweden
Fencers at the 1988 Summer Olympics
Fencers at the 1992 Summer Olympics
Sportspeople from Stockholm
20th-century Swedish people